Penn District is a defunct district that was located in Philadelphia County, Pennsylvania. The district ceased to exist and was incorporated into the City of Philadelphia following the passage of the Act of Consolidation, 1854.

History
Penn District, was a portion of the Penn Township which was north of the north boundary-line of Spring Garden between Delaware, Sixth Street and the Schuylkill River and between a line parallel with Hickory Lane (formerly Coates Street, now Fairmont Avenue), west of Sixth Street as far as Broad Street, and then due west to the Schuylkill, and along the same to a line parallel with, and at a distance of one hundred feet north of Susquehanna Avenue, and thence to the middle of the sixth Street.

It was created a district by Act of the assembly on February 26, 1844, as "the Commissioners and Inhabitants of the district of Penn".

Resources
Chronology of the Political Subdivisions of the County of Philadelphia, 1683-1854
Information courtesy of ushistory.org
Incorporated District, Boroughs, and Townships in the County of Philadelphia, 1854 By Rudolph J. Walther - excerpted from the book at the ushistory.org website

Municipalities in Philadelphia County prior to the Act of Consolidation, 1854
1844 establishments in Pennsylvania
1854 disestablishments in Pennsylvania
Populated places established in 1844